The 2013 D.C. United season was the club's eighteenth, and their eighteenth season in Major League Soccer, the top division of American soccer. The regular season began on March 2 and concluded on October 27.

Outside of MLS play, the club competed in the U.S. Open Cup. Also, for the first time in their history, they played in the Walt Disney World Pro Soccer Classic, a preseason tournament to be held in February, after participating in the Carolina Challenge Cup for the past five seasons.

After a promising 2012 campaign, United's form took a sharp turn downward as injuries, underachievement from offseason acquisitions, and a loss of form caused the team to record the worst season in MLS history. The extremely poor season came as universal shock to fans and media, who thought United would be one of the top contenders in the Eastern Conference, and a potential candidate for the MLS Cup title.

United's top scoring players were Dwayne De Rosario, Luis Silva, and Kyle Porter, who each scored three goals. The club benefited from four own goals—outscoring any player on the team in MLS play.

Despite their poor league play, United qualified for the 2014–15 CONCACAF Champions League by winning the 2013 U.S. Open Cup Final on October 1. That marked their 13th major honor, the most in North American soccer history. As of 2023, this is the most recent major title won by the club.

Background: 2012 season 

After four consecutive seasons of failing to qualify for the playoffs, D.C. United returned to the playoffs by finishing second in the Eastern Conference, and third in the overall tables, amassing a total of 58 points from a record of 17–7–10 (wins, losses, draws). In their return to the playoffs, D.C. United defeated their Atlantic Cup rivals, New York Red Bulls, 2–1 on aggregate. In the Eastern Conference Finals, D.C. United fell to Houston Dynamo 4–2 on aggregate, making it the furthest D.C. United went in the MLS Cup Playoffs since 2006.

Since neither the San Jose Earthquakes nor Sporting Kansas City reached MLS Cup 2012, D.C. United narrowly missed out on qualifying for the 2013–14 CONCACAF Champions League, which would have been United's third appearance in the newly revamped Champions League, their thirteenth overall CONCACAF club tournament, and their first since the 2009–10 season.

Elsewhere, United competed in the U.S. Open Cup, where they fell in the fourth round proper to Philadelphia Union in a penalty shoot-out. During the preseason, United won their third-straight Carolina Challenge Cup.

Review

Offseason 
One of the largest offseason news was the departure of longtime CEO of the club, Kevin Payne, who had been the chief executive officer and president of the D.C. United franchise since its inception in 1994. Payne left on November 27, 2012, reportedly on good terms with the club, to take over as the president of fellow Major League Soccer outfit, Toronto FC. He was announced as Toronto's president the next day, on November 28, 2012.

Prior to the 2012 MLS Re-Entry Draft, United declined options on four players; Mike Chabala, Emiliano Dudar, Maicon Santos and Stephen King. Santos, was selected by Chicago Fire in the first round of the Re-Entry Draft. Held on December 3, 2012, Santos was the only selection in the first stage of the re-entry draft. The second stage was held on December 14, 2012. There, United selected former-Vancouver Whitecaps FC midfielder, John Thorrington. In Thorrington's two seasons in Vancouver, he made 30 appearances.

Preseason/February 
As of December 14, D.C. United will participate in four preseason exhibitions prior to the start of the regular season. Participating in the Walt Disney World Pro Soccer Classic for the first time in franchise history, United open the exhibition tournament on February 9, 2013 against the Tampa Bay Rowdies, the 2012 North American Soccer League (second division) champions. United will subsequently play against Sporting Kansas City and Montreal Impact.

Two weeks into the new year, the 2013 MLS SuperDraft was held, with D.C. United having the 17th overall pick. The club traded away their second round pick in this draft back in 2011 with New England Revolution. Needing defensive depth, it was anticipated that United was going to select a defender from the draft to help bolster the defense, in which they ended up doing. The club selected Taylor Kemp from the Maryland Terrapins men's soccer program.

At the tail end of the winter transfer window, D.C. United announced they had sold midfielder Andy Najar to Belgian outfit Anderlecht. Najar was previously on a month-long loan to Anderlecht, with RSCA eventually exercising an option to purchase out his contract at the end of the loan. Najar became the first home grown player in Major League Soccer to be sold to an overseas club.

March–June 
Ahead of the start of the regular season, Ben Olsen pressed that the club's goals were more than just qualifying for the playoffs, but qualifying for the CONCACAF Champions League, for the first time since the 2009–10 tournament. Several media outlets had the club returning to playoffs in preseason predictions, but in various spots due to offseason transactions and questions as to whether or not the 2013 squad was stronger than the 2012 squad. Many sought that the new ownership group was unwilling to spend on a higher-profile player.

The season began on the road, where the club suffered a late 2–0 loss at Houston. It was the second consecutive season in which D.C. United lost their opening match. The club form improved at home, where they picked up a win at home to Salt Lake and a draw on the road to New York.

After that though the club form dipped, as United went on a thirteen-match winless streak including 10 losses, seeing the team plummet to the bottom of the MLS table. The streak broke on June 22 when D.C. defeated San Jose Earthquakes 1–0 thanks to a penalty kick taken by Chris Pontius at the RFK Memorial, giving DC their second win after three months since their last. Surprisingky, though, United was enjoying much more success in U.S. Open Cup play. Despite struggling to a win over Richmond Kickers in a penalty kick shootout, the team won its next two Open Cup matches, with a pair of convincing 3–1 victories over MLS opposition that included the Philadelphia Union and the New England Revolution.

July–September
Despite breaking the long losing streak with the win over San Jose, the team quickly resumed their losing ways in league play. The team earned only one point over its next five games before finally winning again, with a 3–1 victory over the Montreal Impact, in early August. This win was only the team's third in league play, but it would be the last win in league play during 2013, as the team went winless over the final 12 games. However, just 4 days after the win over Montreal, United traveled to Chicago and gained a surprising 1–0 win in the semifinals of the 2013 U.S. Open Cup tournament.

Finish 
On October 1, D.C. United won the 2013 U.S. Open Cup by defeating Real Salt Lake in the final, on a goal by midfielder Lewis Neal. The win was a massive surprise to most observers, given that DC was in the midst of a 12-game winless streak and had won only three regular-season games all year.

The team finished the year on Oct 27 tied for the fewest regular-season wins, 3, of any team in MLS history. They won more games against MLS opponents, 4, in the U.S. Open Cup than in the regular season, despite playing against MLS opponents in 34 regular-season games and only 4 Open Cup games. Notwithstanding that the team won its first title since last winning the Open cup in 2008, the 2013 D.C. United team set new standards of futility for MLS, as the team ended up with the fewest points per game by any MLS team in history, as well as scoring the fewest goals per game in league history.

Squad

Roster

Team management

Competitions

Preseason

Florida training camp

Walt Disney World Pro Soccer Classic 

Group stage

Consolation match

Major League Soccer

Standings

Results summary

Match results

U.S. Open Cup

Friendlies

2013 Indonesian Tour

Statistics

Appearances and goals 

|-
|colspan="12"|Players who left the club during the 2013 season
|-

|}

Statistics current as of November 3, 2013
Source: D.C. United Season Statistics

Goalkeeping statistics 

Statistics current as of November 3, 2013
Source: D.C. United Season Goalkeeping Statistics

Top scorers

Top assists

Disciplinary record 

Statistics current as of November 3, 2013
Source: D.C. United Season Card Statistics

Transfers

In

Out

Loan in

Loan out

See also 
 D.C. United
 List of D.C. United seasons
 2013 Major League Soccer season
 2013 MLS Cup Playoffs
 2013 U.S. Open Cup
 2013 in American soccer

References 

D.C. United seasons
Dc United
Dc United
2013 in sports in Washington, D.C.
U.S. Open Cup champion seasons